Linusorbs are small biologically active cyclic peptides synthesized in flaxseed (Linum usitatissimum) from two ribosome-derived precursors. The name is derived from Linum usitatissimum orbitide.

The molecules are very stable, not easily digested and stiff.

Nomenclature for Linusorb: [1–#-NαC],[#-Xaa,#-Xaa]-linusorb # 
The International Union of Pure and Applied Chemistry (IUPAC) Nomenclature for Natural Products supports the use of taxonomic names for the development of compound trivial names, while UniProt utilizes standard organism names as well as organism mnemonics in the naming of proteins. Linusorb product name according to Shim et al. (2015).

Linkage [1–#-NαC] Occurs between amino acid 1 and amino acid “#” through the α-amino group that a N-C cyclization of the core peptide. The en dash (–) is used and placed in square brackets.Modifications [#-Xaa,#-Xaa] The notation utilizes a prefix code of 3, 4 characters. Specifies the position and type of modified amino acids in the peptide. Each modified amino acid is identified by its position in the core peptide sequence using abbreviations found in UniProt and IUPAC. A comma separates multiple post-translational modifications.Taxonomic name abbreviation -linus The first three letters of the genus name and first two letters of the species name are used to identify the origin of the orbitide. Based on the list of species maintained by UniProt (http://www.uniprot.org/docs/speclist).Common suffix (-orb) Short for orbitide.Amino acid residue numbering (#) Residue numbering begins at the N-terminal-most amino acid residue of the orbitide, based on DNA sequence. Notation for any post-translational modifications start with the lowest number and proceed to the highest number. Where multiple identical modifications are present, they are grouped together as illustrated for Met groups in [1–8-NαC],[1,3-(Rs,Ss)-MetO]-linusorb A1 (Table 1 and Figure 1; formerly cyclolinopeptide G, CLG). This more descriptive name for CLG reflects the complexity of fully and appropriately naming this compound as it contains the chiral amino acid methionine S-oxide. Clearly, what was formerly recognized as CLG is actually four distinct compounds. New full names for all “cyclolinopeptide” variants are suggested in Table 1.

Table 1. Elements of Linusorb Names

Notes

aProposed orbitide name: [1–#-NαC], linkage occurs between amino acid 1 and amino acid “#” through the α-amino group that a N-C cyclization of the core peptide. Use the en dash (–) as in ranges and place the square brackets; [#-Xaa,#-Xaa], methionine S-oxide has a chiral sulfur. Two diastereomers are designated as Ss and Rs. Identical amino acids substituents are numbered and grouped; lin-, Genus name is recognized by three letters or from UniProt list; -us-, species name is recognized by 2 letters or name from UniProt list; -orb, common suffix for orbitide. 

bName used in first literature description. 

cThe methionine residues of amino acid sequences are highlighted in Figure 1. Abbreviations of the methionine residues are MetO for methionine S-oxide and MetO2 for methionine S,S-dioxide. 

dAFSQ01016651.1. 

eAFSQ01011783.1 and AFSQ01009065.1. 

fAFSQ01016651.1.

References

Peptides